Šlekys is a Lithuanian surname. Notable people with the surname include:

 Audrius Šlekys (1975–2002), Lithuanian football player
 Emilis Šlekys (1951–2012), Lithuanian chess master
 Vaidotas Šlekys (born 1972), Lithuanian football player

Lithuanian-language surnames